Jaguar Land Rover Slovakia is a Slovak subsidiary of the British car producer Jaguar Land Rover, itself a subsidiary of Tata Motors. The factory is located in Nitra and production started in October 2018. It builds the Land Rover Discovery and Land Rover Defender models.

Nitra plant 
The basic facts:
the €1.4bn (£1bn) manufacturing facility in Nitra was opened on 25 October 2018
from about 1500 employees 30 percent are women
all manufacturing employees are educated in the new Training Academy for 12 weeks
the facility area is about 300,000 square meters and the planned annual capacity is 150,000 vehicles
as the first in Europe the plant uses Kuka's Pulse carrier system with over 30 percent faster transfer times.

References

External links 

Motor vehicle assembly plants in Slovakia
Jaguar Land Rover
Companies based in Bratislava
Nitra
Vehicle manufacturing companies established in 2015
Slovakian companies established in 2015
Corporate subsidiaries